Opayo, formerly Sage Pay, is a payments processing service owned by Elavon. It operates in the UK and Ireland. The company provides online payments processing as well as products for face-to-face and telephone payments. It was known by the name Sage Pay while under the ownership of The Sage Group plc between 2006 and 2020, when the payments company had also expanded to Germany, Spain, South Africa and the United States.

History

UK and Ireland 

The Opayo business was founded in 2001 as Protx, a business that processes online payments for small and medium sized businesses. Sage Group purchased Protx for £20 million in 2006. Protx had 10,000 customers in 2006. Protx was rebranded as Sage Pay in April 2009. Sage Pay entered the Irish market and opened a customer service centre in Newcastle upon Tyne during the same year.

 Sage Pay had 300 employees and serves 50,000 customers.

In February 2012 Sage Pay entered the card machine payment market when they acquired Integral Computers Ltd for €20 million. Integral Computers was founded in 1989 and its point of sale technology was used in 25,000 locations in 2012 across the UK and Ireland.

In 2019 Sage Pay and Worldpay, Inc. announced they were to partner to provide additional services in the UK and Ireland.

In November 2019 Elavon announced the acquisition of the UK and Irish Sage Pay business for £232 million. The Sage Salary and Supplier Payments portion of Sage Payments was not included in the deal with Elavon. The sale was completed on 11 March 2020 and the business was rebranded as Opayo in July of the same year.

Germany and Spain  

Sage Pay launched in Germany in October 2012 and in Spain in September 2013. Sage Pay is no longer listed on the German and Spanish Sage websites.

South Africa 
In May 2010, Sage South Africa announced the acquisition of Netcash (Pty) Ltd, a company that provides transaction processing services in three primary areas: electric funds transfer payments, debit order collections and credit card transaction processing.

Netcash had been established in 2002. In 2013 Sage Netcash was rebranded as Sage Pay. Sage sold the South African payments business in July 2019 for £5 million. The South African business reverted to its Netcash name in December 2019.

United States 
Sage previously operated a payments processing service in the United States called Sage Payment Solutions. Sage Group divested the US Sage Payments Solutions business to GTCR in 2017 for $260 million. Sage Payments Solutions was later rebranded as Paya.

See also
 List of online payment service providers

References

External links 
 Opayo by Elavon

Pay
Banking technology
Online payments
Financial services companies established in 2001